Ripley is a village in Brown County, Illinois, United States, named after the popular books and television show "Ripley's Believe It Or Not," located along La Moine River. The population was 53 according to the 2020 census.

History 
Ripley was originally named Centerville. It was originally incorporated on July 20, 1837, then reincorporated on April 10, 1874. Ripley's certificate of incorporation was issued by the Illinois Secretary of State on April 16, 1902. Ripley's native clay made it a center for the manufacture of stoneware.

Geography
Ripley is located at  (40.023771, -90.638887).

Demographics

As of the 2020 census there were 53 people, 27 households, and 17 families residing in the village. The racial makeup of the village was 94.34% White, and 5.66% from two or more races. Hispanic or Latino of any race were 3.77% of the population.

There were 27 households, out of which 22.22% had children under the age of 18 living with them, 55.56% were married couples living together, 7.41% had a female householder with no husband present, and 37.04% were non-families. 37.04% of all households were made up of individuals, and 29.63% had someone living alone who was 65 years of age or older. The average household size was 2.24 and the average family size was 1.78.

The village's age distribution consisted of 12.5% under the age of 18, 0.0% from 18 to 24, 14.6% from 25 to 44, 27.1% from 45 to 64, and 45.8% who were 65 years of age or older. The median age was 64.3 years. For every 100 females, there were 100.0 males. For every 100 females age 18 and over, there were 110.0 males.

The median income for a household in the village was $26,250, and the median income for a family was $-666,666,666. Males had a median income of $38,750 versus $30,625 for females. The per capita income for the village was $18,996. About 11.8% of families and 12.5% of the population were below the poverty line, including 33.3% of those under age 18 and 9.1% of those age 65 or over.

References

Villages in Brown County, Illinois
Villages in Illinois